Imperial Gesture (foaled February 27, 1999) is an American Thoroughbred racehorse who won the 2002 Beldame Stakes.

Career

Imperial Gesture had her first race on July 29, 2001 at Delmar, coming in 2nd place. She captured her first win the following month on August 24, 2001 at Saratoga.

She came in 2nd in both September and October 2001 in the  Oak Leaf Stakes and the Breeders' Cup Juvenile Fillies.

On September 7th, 2002, she won the 2002 Gazelle Handicap and on October 5th, 2002, she won the Beldame Stakes.

Her last race was on October 26, 2002 with a 3rd place finish at the 2002 Breeders' Cup Distaff.

Pedigree

References

1999 racehorse births
Racehorses bred in Kentucky
Racehorses trained in the United States
Thoroughbred family 1-c